Re d'Italia ("King of Italy") may refer to:

 , an ironclad launched in 1863 and sunk at the Battle of Lissa in 1866
 , an ocean liner launched in 1906 and scrapped in 1929.

Ship names